MLIS may mean:

 Molecular laser isotope separation, an isotope separation method
 Master of Library and Information Science, a master's degree in the United States and Canada
 Microlissencephaly, a brain development disorder
 Major League Indoor Soccer, a sports league founded in 2022